Shrewsbury is a borough in Monmouth County, in the U.S. state of New Jersey. Centrally located in the Jersey Shore region in the New York Metropolitan area, the borough is a historic bedroom community of New York City. As of the 2020 United States census, the borough's population was 4,184, an increase of 375 (+9.8%) from the 2010 census count of 3,809, which in turn reflected an increase of 219 (+6.1%) from the 3,590 counted in the 2000 census.

Shrewsbury was formed as a borough by an act of the New Jersey Legislature on March 22, 1926, from portions of Shrewsbury Township, based on the results of a referendum held on May 11, 1926. The borough's name comes from Shrewsbury, England.

History

Shrewsbury was part of the Navesink Patent or Monmouth Tract granted soon after the creation of East Jersey in 1665. The tract included Shrewsbury, along with the other historic towns of Freehold in western Monmouth County and Middletown in northern Monmouth County.

When it was formed in 1693, Shrewsbury covered an area of almost , extending to the north to the Navesink River, south to include all of present-day Ocean County, east to the Atlantic Ocean and west to the present-day border of Monmouth County. It retained its size and scope until 1750, when various different municipalities began to break off from it. The first of those being Stafford Township, which was formed in 1750 and taking away much of modern-day Ocean County. The Parker Homestead, one of the oldest structures in the state, was built by early settlers to the region. Many of the early settlers of the region originated from Long Island, Rhode Island, and Massachusetts.

What is now Shrewsbury Township was originally formed on October 31, 1693, and was created as a township by the Township Act of 1798 of the New Jersey Legislature on February 21, 1798. Shrewsbury Borough broke off from Shrewsbury Township, and was officially established on May 11, 1926.

Geography
According to the United States Census Bureau, the borough had a total area of 2.19 square miles (5.67 km2), including 2.16 square miles (5.60 km2) of land and 0.03 square miles (0.07 km2) of water (1.32%).

The borough borders the Monmouth County municipalities of Eatontown, Little Silver, Oceanport, Red Bank, Shrewsbury Township and Tinton Falls.

Shrewsbury Borough prior to 1926 was a part of Shrewsbury Township, which had originally encompassed most of Monmouth and Ocean County, New Jersey counties, including several of the other municipalities nearby, until finally shrinking down to under one square mile.

Demographics

2010 census

The Census Bureau's 2006–2010 American Community Survey showed that (in 2010 inflation-adjusted dollars) median household income was $111,648 (with a margin of error of +/− $15,595) and the median family income was $124,091 (+/− $10,340). Males had a median income of $111,645 (+/− $13,085) versus $54,313 (+/− $9,453) for females. The per capita income for the borough was $47,698 (+/− $5,936). About none of families and 1.1% of the population were below the poverty line, including none of those under age 18 and 4.3% of those age 65 or over.

2000 census

As of the 2000 United States census there were 3,590 people, 1,207 households, and 1,016 families residing in the borough. The population density was 1,627.1 people per square mile (627.2/km2). There were 1,223 housing units at an average density of 554.3 per square mile (213.7/km2). The racial makeup of the borough was 96.60% White, 0.53% African American, 1.67% Asian, 0.36% from other races, and 0.84% from two or more races. Hispanic or Latino of any race were 1.92% of the population.

There were 1,207 households, out of which 46.0% had children under the age of 18 living with them, 74.6% were married couples living together, 7.2% had a female householder with no husband present, and 15.8% were non-families. 12.9% of all households were made up of individuals, and 6.9% had someone living alone who was 65 years of age or older. The average household size was 2.96 and the average family size was 3.27.

In the borough the population was spread out, with 30.8% under the age of 18, 4.0% from 18 to 24, 28.1% from 25 to 44, 25.1% from 45 to 64, and 12.0% who were 65 years of age or older. The median age was 38 years. For every 100 females, there were 98.5 males. For every 100 females age 18 and over, there were 93.2 males.

The median income for a household in the borough was $86,911, and the median income for a family was $92,719. Males had a median income of $85,875 versus $37,554 for females. The per capita income for the borough was $38,218. None of the families and 1.0% of the population were living below the poverty line, including no under 18 and 3.0% of those over 64.

Economy
The Grove at Shrewsbury is an upscale lifestyle center located on Route 35. As of 2022, it is anchored by Brooks Brothers, Anthropologie, J. Crew, Williams Sonoma and Banana Republic, along with other retailers and amenities. It acts as a town square for the borough, along with the nearby downtown of Red Bank.

Government

Local government
Shrewsbury is governed under the Borough form of New Jersey municipal government, which is used in 218 municipalities (of the 564) statewide, making it the most common form of government in New Jersey. The governing body is comprised of the Mayor and the Borough Council, with all positions elected at-large on a partisan basis as part of the November general election. A Mayor is elected directly by the voters to a four-year term of office. The Borough Council is comprised of six members elected to serve three-year terms on a staggered basis, with two seats coming up for election each year in a three-year cycle. The Borough form of government used by Shrewsbury is a "weak mayor / strong council" government in which council members act as the legislative body with the mayor presiding at meetings and voting only in the event of a tie. The mayor can veto ordinances subject to an override by a two-thirds majority vote of the council. The mayor makes committee and liaison assignments for council members, and most appointments are made by the mayor with the advice and consent of the council.

, the mayor of Shrewsbury Borough is Republican Erik Anderson, whose term of office ends December 31, 2022. Members of the Borough Council are Council President Jason Sena (R, 2022), Deidre M. DerAsadourian (R, 2022), Donald J. Eddy (R, 2024), Brendan Gilmartin (R, 2023), Daniel Levy (R, 2024) and Jaclyn Woehnker (R, 2023; appointed to serve an unexpired term).

The borough council appointed Jaclyn Woehnker in February 2022 to fill the seat expiring in December 2023 that had been held by Kimberly Eulner until she stepped down from office in December 2021 to take office in the New Jersey General Assembly. Woehnker will serve on an interim basis until the November 2022 general election, when voters will choose a candidate to serve the remainder of the term of office.

In February 2016, the Borough Council selected Erik Anderson to fill the seat expiring in December 2017 that had been held by William E. Dodge until his resignation earlier that month.

Federal, state and county representation
Shrewsbury Borough is located in the 4th Congressional District and is part of New Jersey's 11th state legislative district. Prior to the 2011 reapportionment following the 2010 Census, Shrewsbury Borough had been in the 12th state legislative district.

 

Monmouth County is governed by a Board of County Commissioners comprised of five members who are elected at-large to serve three year terms of office on a staggered basis, with either one or two seats up for election each year as part of the November general election. At an annual reorganization meeting held in the beginning of January, the board selects one of its members to serve as director and another as deputy director. , Monmouth County's Commissioners are
Commissioner Director Thomas A. Arnone (R, Neptune City, term as commissioner and as director ends December 31, 2022), 
Commissioner Deputy Director Susan M. Kiley (R, Hazlet Township, term as commissioner ends December 31, 2024; term as deputy commissioner director ends 2022),
Lillian G. Burry (R, Colts Neck Township, 2023),
Nick DiRocco (R, Wall Township, 2022), and 
Ross F. Licitra (R, Marlboro Township, 2023). 
Constitutional officers elected on a countywide basis are
County clerk Christine Giordano Hanlon (R, 2025; Ocean Township), 
Sheriff Shaun Golden (R, 2022; Howell Township) and 
Surrogate Rosemarie D. Peters (R, 2026; Middletown Township).

Politics

As of March 2011, there were a total of 2,844 registered voters in Shrewsbury, of which 650 (22.9%) were registered as Democrats, 863 (30.3%) were registered as Republicans and 1,330 (46.8%) were registered as Unaffiliated. There as one voter registered to another party.

In the 2012 presidential election, Republican Mitt Romney received 57.2% of the vote (1,205 cast), ahead of Democrat Barack Obama with 41.6% (876 votes), and other candidates with 1.3% (27 votes), among the 2,120 ballots cast by the borough's 2,935 registered voters (12 ballots were spoiled), for a turnout of 72.2%. In the 2008 presidential election, Republican John McCain received 54.5% of the vote (1,248 cast), ahead of Democrat Barack Obama with 42.8% (980 votes) and other candidates with 1.3% (30 votes), among the 2,291 ballots cast by the borough's 2,944 registered voters, for a turnout of 77.8%. In the 2004 presidential election, Republican George W. Bush received 58.9% of the vote (1,305 ballots cast), outpolling Democrat John Kerry with 40.2% (891 votes) and other candidates with 0.6% (18 votes), among the 2,217 ballots cast by the township's 2,834 registered voters, for a turnout percentage of 78.2.

In the 2013 gubernatorial election, Republican Chris Christie received 72.5% of the vote (955 cast), ahead of Democrat Barbara Buono with 26.4% (348 votes), and other candidates with 1.1% (14 votes), among the 1,330 ballots cast by the borough's 3,000 registered voters (13 ballots were spoiled), for a turnout of 44.3%. In the 2009 gubernatorial election, Republican Chris Christie received 65.3% of the vote (1,063 ballots cast), ahead of  Democrat Jon Corzine with 24.8% (404 votes), Independent Chris Daggett with 8.3% (135 votes) and other candidates with 0.9% (14 votes), among the 1,628 ballots cast by the borough's 2,885 registered voters, yielding a 56.4% turnout.

Historic district

The Shrewsbury Historic District is a historic district located along Broad and Sycamore Streets. The village was an important transportation artery during colonial times.

The district was added to the National Register of Historic Places on July 17, 1978, for its significance in architecture and religion. Three churches, the Allen House, and the Wardell House are among its 47 contributing buildings.

Education

The Shrewsbury Borough School District serves public school students ranging from pre-kindergarten through eighth grade at the Shrewsbury Borough School. As of the 2018–19 school year, the district, comprised of one school, had an enrollment of 479 students and 50.3 classroom teachers (on an FTE basis), for a student–teacher ratio of 9.5:1. The school features three homerooms per grade, with special classes that include physical education, art, music, computers, and for language, Spanish.

For ninth through twelfth grades, public school students attend Red Bank Regional High School, which serves students from the boroughs of Little Silver, Red Bank and Shrewsbury, along with students in the district's academy programs from other communities who are eligible to attend on a tuition basis. Students from other Monmouth County municipalities are eligible to attend the high school for its performing arts program, with admission on a competitive basis. The borough has two elected representatives on the nine-member Board of Education. As of the 2018–19 school year, the high school had an enrollment of 1,208 students and 119.6 classroom teachers (on an FTE basis), for a student–teacher ratio of 10.1:1.

Private school options include Christian Brothers Academy or Red Bank Catholic High School, the local Catholic schools, operated by the Roman Catholic Diocese of Trenton.

Transportation

Roads and highways

Route 35 is the main north–south road in Shrewsbury, while CR 520 is oriented east–west along the northern border.

The Garden State Parkway is accessible in neighboring Tinton Falls or via CR 520 in Middletown.

Public transportation
NJ Transit offers train service on the North Jersey Coast Line at the Little Silver station. NJ Transit local bus service is available on the 831 and 832 routes.

Notable people

People who were born in, residents of, or otherwise closely associated with Shrewsbury include:

 Alfred N. Beadleston (1912–2000), politician who served as Speaker of the New Jersey General Assembly and President of the New Jersey Senate, after serving as mayor of Shrewsbury
 Alisyn Camerota (born 1966), anchor of CNN's morning show New Day and a former news anchor for Fox News Channel
 Kimberly Eulner (born 1966), politician who has represented the 11th Legislative district in the New Jersey General Assembly since she took office in 2022
 Jake Kalish (born 1991), professional baseball pitcher
 Ryan Kalish (born 1988), outfielder with the Chicago Cubs
 John Eatton Le Conte (1784–1860), naturalist and a member of one of America's most important early families devoted to science
 Richard Lippincott (1615–1683), English Quaker and an early settler in Shrewsbury
 Greg Montgomery (born 1964), former National Football League punter from 1988–1997, who played for the Houston Oilers, Detroit Lions and Baltimore Ravens
 Michael J. Panter (born 1969), who represented the 12th Legislative District in the New Jersey General Assembly from 2006 to 2008
 John Lloyd Stephens (1805–1852), explorer, writer, and diplomat, who was a pivotal figure in the rediscovery of Maya civilization throughout Middle America and in the planning of the Panama railway

References

External links

 Borough of Shrewsbury official website

 
1926 establishments in New Jersey
Borough form of New Jersey government
Boroughs in Monmouth County, New Jersey
Populated places established in 1926
National Register of Historic Places in Monmouth County, New Jersey
Historic districts on the National Register of Historic Places in New Jersey
New Jersey Register of Historic Places